The Tat Sae Waterfalls, also referred to as the Tad Sae Waterfalls are waterfalls located along a tributary of the Nam Khan River in Luang Prabang Province, Laos. The falls flow over limestone formations amongst trees.

References

Waterfalls of Laos
Geography of Luang Prabang province